The 1887 North East Cork by-election was a parliamentary by-election held for the United Kingdom House of Commons constituency of North East Cork on 16 May 1887. The vacancy arose because of the resignation of the sitting member, Edmund Leamy of the Irish Parliamentary Party. In the ensuing by-election another Irish Parliamentary Party candidate, William O'Brien, former member for South Tyrone, was elected unopposed.

References

1887 elections in the United Kingdom
May 1887 events
By-elections to the Parliament of the United Kingdom in County Cork constituencies
Unopposed by-elections to the Parliament of the United Kingdom in Irish constituencies
1887 elections in Ireland